The Theban Tomb TT6 is located in  Deir el-Medina, part of the Theban Necropolis, on the west bank of the Nile, opposite to Luxor. It is the burial place of the ancient Egyptian artisans named Neferhotep and Nebnefer (father and son respectively), who lived during the end of the 18th and beginning of the 19th Dynasty.

Neferhotep the Younger, son of Nebnufer and grandson of Neferhotep is buried in TT216.

Tomb
In the passage into the tomb both Nebnefer and Neferhotep are mentioned. Neferhotep is called Chief Workman in the Place of Truth.

In the chapel the right side shows the son Nebnufer. He is depicted with his wife Iyi before a goddess. In another scene Nebnufer, his wife Iyi and her mother Ese receive offerings, while nearby Nebnufer and Iyi are shown playing a game. In the scene where Nebnefer and his wife adore Re-Harakhti, he is specifically said to be the son of the dignitary of the Western Side, Chief workman of the Place of Truth, Neferhotep.

The left side of the chapel shows scenes with Neferhotep and his wife Iyemwaw. The couple appear with several children. Their son Nakhy is an army scribe and chariot warrior of His Majesty, Mose is a transport officer of His Majesty, horse groom and Porter of the temple of Usermaatre Setepenre. A daughter Tuya also appears before her parents.
The ceiling has two parallel inscriptions. One for Nebnefer and his wife, the other for Neferhotep and his wife.

A shrine contains more scenes. Neferhotep and Nebnufer are shown with relatives before Khnum, Anuqet and Satis in one scene, while they appear before Anuqet and the Horus falcon in another.

See also
 List of Theban tombs

References

Buildings and structures completed in the 13th century BC
Theban tombs